Coign is an  older spelling of Quoin, and may refer to:

 Coign (architecture),  masonry blocks at the corner of a wall
 Coign (gunnery), a wedge used in aiming a cannon
 Coign (printing), wooden or metal wedges used for locking printing type into a chase
 A coign, in Crystallography, is the point at which three facets of a crystal meet
 A coign, in Geology, is an angular plate around which a continent has formed

See also
 Coign of vantage, an elevated observation point 
 Coign and livery, military exactions in Gaelic Ireland